The 2023 All Thailand Golf Tour is the 25th season of the All Thailand Golf Tour, the main professional golf tour in Thailand since it was established in 1999. It is the fifth season in which Official World Golf Ranking points are awarded.

Schedule
The following table lists official events during the 2023 season.

Notes

References

All Thailand Golf Tour
All Thailand Golf Tour
All Thailand Golf Tour
All Thailand Golf Tour